Driehuizen is the name of several locations in the Netherlands:

 Driehuizen, Alkmaar in North Holland
 Driehuizen, Texel in North Holland
 Driehuizen, Baarle-Nassau in North Brabant
 Driehuizen, Hilvarenbeek in North Brabant
 Driehuizen, Eersel in North Brabant
 Driehuizen, Friesland